Al-Midaina District is a district of the Basra Governorate, Iraq. Its seat is the city of Al-Midaina.

Districts of Basra Province